was a Japanese football player.

Club career
Tamai was born in Hyogo Prefecture on December 16, 1903. He played for Waseda WMW was consisted of his alma mater Waseda University players and graduates. At the club, he played with many Japan national team players Shigeyoshi Suzuki, Haruo Arima, Tamotsu Asakura, Shigeru Takahashi, Shojiro Sugimura, Nagayasu Honda, Ko Takamoro and Michiyo Taki.

National team career
In August 1927, when Tamai was a Waseda University student, he was selected Japan national team for 1927 Far Eastern Championship Games in Shanghai. At this competition, on August 27, he debuted and scored a goal against Republic of China. On August 29, he also played against Philippines and Japan won this match. This is Japan national team first victory in International A Match. He played 2 games and scored 1 goal for Japan in 1927.

After retirement
After retirement, Tamai became a vice-president of Japan Football Association from 1957 to 1976.

On December 23, 1978, Tamai died of heart failure in Kobe at the age of 75. In 2006, he was selected Japan Football Hall of Fame.

National team statistics

References

External links
 
 Japan National Football Team Database
Japan Football Hall of Fame at Japan Football Association

1903 births
1978 deaths
Waseda University alumni
Association football people from Hyōgo Prefecture
Japanese footballers
Japan international footballers
Association football forwards